Soundarya was an Indian actress who worked predominantly in Telugu films in addition to Kannada and Tamil films. She made her film debut through the Kannada film Gandharva (1992). The following year, she debuted in Telugu and Tamil with the films Manavarali Pelli and Ponnumani respectively. She received critical acclaim for her role in the latter. Between 1993 & 1994, she appeared in several commercially successful Telugu films, notably Rajendrudu Gajendrudu, Mayalodu, Number One and Hello Brother. However, she had her career breakthrough with Ammoru (1995), a film which garnered her the Filmfare Award for Best Actress – Telugu. In 1996, she featured in the highly successful film Pavitra Bandham and won the Nandi Award for Best Actress. The success of these films established her as the leading actress of Telugu cinema. She achieved further success with films like Pelli Chesukundam, Choodalani Vundi, Dongaata and Arunachalam, the latter being her first venture with Rajinikanth.

Her portrayal of an NRI woman falling prey to the extreme abuse by her father-in-law in the film Anthahpuram (1998) was highly applauded by critics. She won several accolades, including her second Filmfare Best Actress award and the Nandi Special Jury Award. In 1999, she featured in the romantic drama Raja, which earned her the third Filmfare Best Actress award as well as the Industry Hit film Padayappa. The same year, she appeared opposite Amitabh Bachchan in the film Sooryavansham, her first and only venture in Bollywood. Her career saw a further rise with films like Annayya, Ninne Premistha, Azad, 9 Nelalu and Eduruleni Manishi, which garnered her positive reviews. In 2002, she acted as the protagonist and co-produced the film Dweepa, which won numerous accolades including two National Film Awards. Her subsequent films in Telugu failed at the box office in the early 2000s. Her only successful films around this time included the only two Malayalam films of hers, Yathrakarude Sradhakku (2002) and Kilichundan Mampazham (2003). Swetha Naagu became her last release while being alive; it was her 100th film. Post her death, Shiva Shankar and Apthamitra marked her posthumous releases. She was also awarded the Filmfare Award for Best Actress – Kannada for Apthamitra posthumously.

Films in Telugu

Other languages

Television

See also
List of Indian film actresses 
Telugu cinema

Notes

References

External links 
 

Indian filmographies
Actress filmographies